Cycling, for the 2017 Island Games, held at Visby with the mountain bike events held at Östergravar, Visby, Gotland, Sweden in June 2017.

Events

 Time Trial at Langs väg - 37km for Men and Women
 Mountain Bike Cross Country at East Moat - 3,8km course
 Road Race at Barlingbo - 115km for Men, 77km for Women
 Mountain Bike Criteriun at North Moat - three laps for Men, two for Women
 Town Criterium at The Mills - 2km course

Medal table

Results

Men's

Women's

References

2017
Cycling
Island Games